Oklahoma is a census-designated place located in Sandy Township, Clearfield County, in the state of Pennsylvania. As of the 2020 census the population was 759. It is bordered to the northwest by the city of DuBois.

Demographics

References

Census-designated places in Clearfield County, Pennsylvania
Census-designated places in Pennsylvania